An interpunct , also known as an interpoint, middle dot, middot and centered dot or centred dot, is a punctuation mark consisting of a vertically centered dot used for interword separation in ancient Latin script. (Word-separating spaces did not appear until some time between 600 and 800CE.)

The multiplication dot (Unicode ) is frequently used in mathematical and scientific notation, and it may differ in appearance from the interpunct.

In written language
Various dictionaries use the interpunct (in this context, sometimes called a hyphenation point) to indicate where to split a word and insert a hyphen if the word doesn't fit on the line. There is also a separate Unicode character, .

English 

In British typography, the space dot was once used as the formal decimal point. Its use was advocated by laws and can still be found in some UK-based academic journals such as The Lancet. When the pound sterling was decimalised in 1971, the official advice issued was to write decimal amounts with a raised point (for example) and to use a decimal point "on the line" only when typesetting constraints made it unavoidable. However, this usage had already been declining since the 1968 ruling by the Ministry of Technology to use the full stop as the decimal point, not only because of that ruling but also because it is the widely-adopted international standard, and because the standard UK keyboard layout (for typewriters and computers) has only the full stop. The space dot is still used by some in handwriting.

In the early modern era, full stops (periods) were sometimes written as interpuncts (for example in the handwritten Mayflower Compact).

In the Shavian alphabet, interpuncts replace capitalization as the marker of proper nouns. The dot is placed at the beginning of a word.

Catalan

The   ("flying point") is used in Valencian/Catalan between two Ls in cases where each belongs to a separate syllable, for example , "cell". This distinguishes such "geminate Ls", which are pronounced , from "double L", which are written without the flying point and are pronounced . In situations where the flying point is unavailable, periods (as in ) or hyphens (as in ) are frequently used as substitutes, but this is tolerated rather than encouraged.

Historically, medieval Valencian/Catalan also used the symbol  as a marker for certain elisions, much like the modern apostrophe (see Occitan below) and hyphenations.

There is no separate keyboard layout for Catalan: the flying point can be typed using  in the Spanish (Spain) layout.

Chinese
The interpunct is used in Chinese (which generally lacks spacing between characters) to mark divisions in transliterated foreign words, particularly names. This is properly (and in Taiwan formally) a full-width partition sign (Unicode code point U+2027, Hyphenation Point), although sometimes narrower forms are substituted for aesthetic reasons. In particular, the regular interpunct is more commonly used as a computer input, although Chinese-language fonts typically render this as full width. When the Chinese text is romanized, the partition sign is simply replaced by a standard space or other appropriate punctuation.

The partition sign is also used to separate book and chapter titles when they are mentioned consecutively: book first and then chapter.

Hokkien
In Pe̍h-ōe-jī for Taiwanese Hokkien, middle dot is often used as a workaround for dot above right diacritic because most early encoding systems did not support this diacritic. Unicode did not support this diacritic until June 2004. Newer fonts often support it natively; however, the practice of using middle dot still exists. Historically, it was derived in the late 19th century from an older barred-o with curly tail as an adaptation to the typewriter.

Tibetan

In Tibetan the interpunct ⟨་⟩, called , is used as a morpheme delimiter.

Ethiopic 
The Geʽez (Ethiopic) script traditionally separates words with an interpunct of two vertically aligned dots, like a colon, but with larger dots:  (For example  Starting in the late 19th century the use of such punctuation has largely fallen out of use in favor of whitespace, except in formal hand-written or liturgical texts. In Eritrea the character may be used as a comma.

Franco-Provençal
In Franco-Provençal (or Arpitan), the interpunct is used in order to distinguish the following graphemes:
 ch·, pronounced , versus ch, pronounced 
 j·, pronounced , versus j, pronounced 
 g· before e, i, pronounced , versus g before e, i, pronounced

French 
In modern French, the interpunct is sometimes used for gender-neutral writing, as in « les salarié·e·s » for « les salariés et les salariées ».

Greek 
Ancient Greek did not have spacing or interpuncts but instead ran all the letters together. By Late Antiquity, various marks were used to separate words, particularly the Greek comma.

It is also used to introduce lists in the manner of an English colon. In Greek text, Unicode provides a unique code point——but it is also expressed as an interpunct. In practice, the separate code point for ano teleia canonically decomposes to the interpunct.

The Hellenistic scholars of Alexandria first developed the mark for a function closer to the comma, before it fell out of use and was then repurposed for its present role.

Japanese 

Interpuncts are often used to separate transcribed foreign names or words written in katakana. For example, "Can't Buy Me Love" becomes . A middle dot is also sometimes used to separate lists in Japanese instead of the Japanese comma ("" known as ). Dictionaries and grammar lessons in Japanese sometimes also use a similar symbol to separate a verb suffix from its root. Note that while some fonts may render the Japanese middle dot as a square under great magnification, this is not a defining property of the middle dot that is used in China or Japan.

However, the Japanese writing system usually does not use space or punctuation to separate words (though the mixing of katakana, kanji and hiragana gives some indication of word boundary).

In Japanese typography, there exist two Unicode code points:
 , with a fixed width that is the same as most kana characters, known as fullwidth.
 

The interpunct also has a number of other uses in Japanese, including the following: to separate titles, names and positions:  (Assistant Section Head · Suzuki); as a decimal point when writing numbers in kanji: ; as a slash when writing for "or" in abbreviations: ; and in place of hyphens, dashes and colons when writing vertically.

Korean 
Interpuncts are used in written Korean to denote a list of two or more words, similarly to how a slash (/) is used to juxtapose words in many other languages. The use of interpuncts has declined in years of digital typography and especially in place of slashes, but, in the strictest sense, a slash cannot replace a middle dot in Korean typography.

 is used more than a middle dot when an interpunct is to be used in Korean typography, though araea is technically not a punctuation symbol but actually an obsolete Hangul jamo. Because araea is a full-width letter, it looks better than middle dot between Hangul. In addition, it is drawn like the middle dot in Windows default Korean fonts such as Batang.

Latin 
The interpunct was regularly used in classical Latin to separate words. In addition to the most common round form, inscriptions sometimes use a small equilateral triangle for the interpunct, pointing either up or down. It may also appear as a mid-line comma, similar to the Greek practice of the time. The interpunct fell out of use , and Latin was then written  for several centuries.

Occitan 
In Occitan, especially in the Gascon dialect, the interpunct (punt interior, literally, "inner dot", or ponch naut for "high / upper point") is used to distinguish the following graphemes:
 s·h, pronounced , versus sh, pronounced , for example, in des·har 'to undo' vs deishar 'to leave'
 n·h, pronounced , versus nh, pronounced , for example in in·hèrn 'hell' vs vinha 'vineyard'
Although it is considered to be a spelling error, a period is frequently used when a middle dot is unavailable: des.har, in.hèrn, which is the case for French keyboard layout.

In Old Occitan, the symbol · was sometimes used to denote certain elisions, much like the modern apostrophe, the only difference being that the word that gets to be elided is always placed after the interpunct, the word before ending either in a vowel sound or the letter n:
 que·l (que lo, that the) versus qu'el (that he)
 From Bertran de Born's Ab joi mou lo vers e·l comens (translated by James H. Donalson):

Bela Domna·l vostre cors gens 
E·lh vostre bel olh m'an conquis, 
E·l doutz esgartz e lo clars vis, 
E·l vostre bels essenhamens, 
Que, can be m'en pren esmansa, 
De beutat no·us trob egansa: 
La genser etz c'om posc'e·l mon chauzir, 
O no·i vei clar dels olhs ab que·us remir.

Domna·l  = Domna, lo ("Lady, the": singular definite article) 
E·lh  = E li ("And the": plural definite article) 
E·l  = E lo ("And the") 
E·l = E lo ("And the") 

No·us  = Non vos ("(do) not... you": direct object pronoun) 
E·l = En lo ("in the") 
No·i   = Non i ("(do) not... there") // Que·us  = Que vos ("that (I)... you")

O pretty lady, all your grace 
and eyes of beauty conquered me, 
sweet glance and brightness of your face 
and all your nature has to tell 
so if I make an appraisal 
I find no one like in beauty: 
most pleasing to be found in all the world 
or else the eyes I see you with have dimmed.

Old Irish 
In many linguistic works discussing Old Irish (but not in actual Old Irish manuscripts), the interpunct is used to separate a pretonic preverbal element from the stressed syllable of the verb, e.g.  "gives". It is also used in citing the verb forms used after such preverbal elements (the prototonic forms), e.g.  "carries", to distinguish them from forms used without preverbs, e.g.  "carries". In other works, the hyphen ( (do- prefix)) or colon may be used for this purpose.

Runes 
Runic texts use either an interpunct-like or a colon-like punctuation mark to separate words.

In mathematics and science

Up to the middle of the 20th century, and sporadically even much later, the interpunct could be found used as the decimal marker in British publications, such as tables of constants (e.g., ""). This made expressions such as  potentially ambiguous; in which it could denote either , or ? In situations where the interpunct is used as a decimal point, the multiplication sign used is usually a full stop (period), not an interpunct.

In publications conforming to the standards of the International System of Units, as well as the multiplication sign (×), the centered dot (dot operator) or space (often typographically a non-breaking space) can be used as a multiplication sign. Only a comma or full stop (period) may be used as a decimal marker. However, when the decimal point is used as the decimal marker, as in the United States, the use of a centered dot for the multiplication of numbers or values of quantities is discouraged.

When dealing with scalars, it is interchangeable with the multiplication sign, as long as the multiplication sign is between numerals such that it would not be mistaken as variable . However, when dealing with vectors, the dot operator denotes a dot product (e.g. , a scalar), which is distinct from the cross product (e.g. , a vector).

Another usage of this symbol in mathematics is with functions, where the dot is used as a placeholder for a function argument, in order to distinguish between the (general form of the) function itself and the value or a specific form of a function evaluated at a given point or with given speicifications. For example,  denotes the function , and  denotes a partial application, where the first two arguments are given and the third argument shall take any valid value on its domain.

The bullet operator, U+2219, is sometimes used to denote the "AND" relationship in formal logic.

In computing, the middle dot is usually displayed (but not printed) to indicate white space in various software applications such as word processing, graphic design, web layout, desktop publishing or software development programs. In some word processors, interpuncts are used to denote not only hard space or space characters, but also sometimes used to indicate a space when put in paragraph format to show indentations and spaces. This allows the user to see where white space is located in the document and what sizes of white space are used, since normally white space is invisible so tabs, spaces, non-breaking spaces and such are indistinguishable from one another.

In chemistry, the middle dot is used to separate the parts of formulas of addition compounds, mixture salts or solvates (typically hydrates), such as of copper(II) sulphate pentahydrate, . The middle dot should not be surrounded by spaces when indicating a chemical adduct.

The middot as a letter

A middot may be used as a consonant or modifier letter, rather than as punctuation, in transcription systems and in language orthographies. For such uses Unicode provides the code point .

In the Sinological tradition of the 36 initials, the onset 影 (typically reconstructed as a glottal stop) may be transliterated with a middot , and the onset 喩 (typically reconstructed as a null onset) with an apostrophe . Conventions vary, however, and it is common for 影 to be transliterated with the apostrophe. 
These conventions are used both for Chinese itself and for other scripts of China, such as ʼPhags-pa and Jurchen.

In Americanist phonetic notation, the middot is a more common variant of the colon  used to indicate vowel length. It may be called a half-colon in such usage. Graphically, it may be high in the letter space (the top dot of the colon) or centered as the interpunct. From Americanist notation, it has been adopted into the orthographies of several languages, such as Washo.

In the writings of Franz Boas, the middot was used for palatal or palatalized consonants, e.g.  for IPA [c].

In the Canadian Aboriginal Syllabics, a middle dot ⟨ᐧ⟩ indicates a syllable medial ⟨w⟩ in Cree and Ojibwe, ⟨y⟩ or ⟨yu⟩ in some of the Athapascan languages, and a syllable medial ⟨s⟩ in Blackfoot. However, depending on the writing tradition, the middle dot may appear after the syllable it modifies (which is found in the Western style) or before the syllable it modifies (which is found in the Northern and Eastern styles).

Keyboard input 
On computers, the interpunct may be available through various key combinations, depending on the operating system and the keyboard layout. Assuming a QWERTY keyboard layout unless otherwise stated:
 on Linux computers with the X Window System and on ChromeOS it can be inserted by pressing ; it can also be inserted via the Compose key sequence . Alternatively, using the generic Unicode input method, it may be obtained by pressing  and then typing  (B7 Is the Unicode hexadecimal codepoint for the interpunct);

Similar symbols

Characters in the Symbol column above may not render correctly in all browsers.

See also
 Punctuation
 Syllabification
 Dot (disambiguation)

Notes

References

External links 
 

Punctuation
Latin-script diacritics
Ancient Greek punctuation

eu:Erdiko puntu